Andrei Poverlovici (born 17 October 1985) is a former Romanian footballer who played as a defender. He retired in 2022, after last playing for Liga III club Olimpic Cetate Râșnov. In his career, Poverlovici also played for teams such as FC Brașov, Unirea Alba Iulia, Victoria Brănești, FC Botoșani or SR Brașov, among others.

References

External links

1985 births
Living people
Sportspeople from Brașov
Romanian footballers
Association football defenders
FC Brașov (1936) players
CS Brănești players
CSM Unirea Alba Iulia players
FC Botoșani players
CSM Corona Brașov footballers
FC Voluntari players
Liga I players
Liga II players
Liga III players